The Federation of Nigeria was a predecessor to modern-day Nigeria from 1954 to 1963. It was a British protectorate until its independence on 1 October 1960.

British rule of Colonial Nigeria ended in 1960, when the Nigeria Independence Act 1960 made the federation an independent sovereign state. Elizabeth II remained head of state as the Queen of Nigeria, as well as other dominions and commonwealth realms. Her constitutional roles in Nigeria were exercisable by the Governor-General of Nigeria. Three people held the office of governor-general during the whole existence of the Federation of Nigeria:

 Sir John Stuart Macpherson 1954 - 15 June 1955
 Sir James Wilson Robertson 15 June 1955 - 16 November 1960
 Dr. Nnamdi Azikiwe 16 November 1960 – 1 October 1963

Sir Abubakar Tafawa Balewa held office as prime minister (and head of government).

The Federal Republic of Nigeria came into existence on 1 October 1963. The monarchy was abolished and Nigeria became a republic within the Commonwealth. Following the abolition of the monarchy, former Governor-General Nnamdi Azikiwe became President of Nigeria, as a ceremonial post under the 1963 constitution.

Elizabeth II visited Nigeria in 1956 (28 January–16 February).

Stamps of the Federation

See also
Federalism in Nigeria

References

External links

States and territories established in 1960
States and territories disestablished in 1963
Nigeria
Government of Nigeria
Political history of Nigeria
Nigeria and the Commonwealth of Nations
Monarchy
Politics of Nigeria
1960 establishments in Nigeria
1963 disestablishments in Nigeria